Robert Courtland Rathbun (born November 25, 1954) is an American sportscaster, motivational speaker, and author. He has been the television play-by-play announcer for the Atlanta Hawks basketball games on Bally Sports South since 1996.

He is the play-by-play announcer for the NBA Atlanta Hawks, and the WNBA Atlanta Dream. He is currently partnered with Dominique Wilkins, a nine-time NBA All-Star and player for the Hawks. In addition, Rathbun also serves as the play-by-play announcer for Southeastern Conference football games on FSN South and Atlantic Coast Conference college basketball and football games for Raycom Sports.

Rathbun served as the play-by-play announcer on Atlanta Braves baseball games on Fox Sports Net (formerly SportsSouth) from 1997 to 2006.

Rathbun began his career as a sports director for WSTP Radio in Salisbury, North Carolina, in 1973.

Rathbun served as the lead broadcaster for ESPN covering ArenaBowl '87, the inaugural championship game of the Arena Football League, alongside Lee Corso in 1987.

He has previously done broadcast work for both the Washington Bullets and Baltimore Orioles. His baseball experience includes play-by-play gigs with Tidewater Tides, and the Richmond Braves.

From 1992 to 1994, Rathbun worked as a radio broadcaster for the Detroit Tigers. Rathbun and Rick Rizzs replaced legendary Tigers' voice Ernie Harwell and his partner Paul Carey.   Rathbun was very unpopular with Detroit fans.  At the end of the 1994 season, Rizzs and Rathbun were fired.

Prior to the Hawks' December 5, 2022 game against the Oklahoma City Thunder, Rathbun had a medical emergency live on-air. Hawks' sideline reporter Lauren Jbara filled in for him in the game. Mike Morgan (sportscaster) was hired to fill in for Rathbun for the next few Hawks games before he returned on December 19.

After being named Virginia Sportscaster of the Year six separate times, he was awarded the same honor in Georgia in 1998. In 2008, he was named to the Virginia Sports Hall of Fame.

Rathbun is a 1976 graduate of Catawba College in Salisbury, North Carolina and was inducted in the school's Sports Hall of Fame in 2006, and a recipient of the Distinguished Alumni Award in 1988.

References

External links
 Bio from the Atlanta Hawks' website
 Official website

1954 births
American sports announcers
Arena football announcers
Atlanta Braves announcers
Atlanta Hawks announcers
Atlanta Thrashers announcers
Baltimore Orioles announcers
Catawba College alumni
College basketball announcers in the United States
College football announcers
Detroit Tigers announcers
Living people
Major League Baseball broadcasters
Minor League Baseball broadcasters
National Basketball Association broadcasters
People from South Kingstown, Rhode Island
Washington Bullets announcers
Women's college basketball announcers in the United States
Women's National Basketball Association announcers